All India Forward Bloc (Subhasist), an Indian political party. AIFB(S) is a splinter group of Tamil Nadu Forward Bloc. AIFB(S) is mainly concentrated in Southern India, in states as Tamil Nadu and Karnataka. The party was founded in 1963 by Sasivarna Thevar, after a power vacuum led Thevar to try to take control of the All India Forward Bloc (AIFB) party in Tamil Nadu. When he failed, he quit to launch the Subhasist Forward Bloc party, a splinter group of the AIFB. The party is mainly concentrated in Southern India, in the states of Tamil Nadu and Karnataka. The general secretary of the party is K. Kandasamy.

In the 2003 by-elections in Tamil Nadu, AIFB(S) supported All India Anna Dravida Munnetra Kazhagam (AIADMK).

References

Political parties in Tamil Nadu
1963 establishments in Madras State
Political parties established in 1963
All India Forward Bloc